Serge Georges Jr. (Born 1969/1970) is an Associate Justice of the Massachusetts Supreme Judicial Court and a former Judge of the Boston Municipal Court.

Education 

Georges earned his Bachelor of Arts from Boston College in 1992 and his Juris Doctor from the Suffolk University Law School in 1996.

Legal and academic career 

Georges was a partner at Barron & Stadfeld, P.C., the Managing Director for Major, Lindsey & Africa, LLC, and an associate at both Todd & Weld and Rackemann, Sawyer & Brewster. He then went on to open his own solo practice. He has been an adjunct professor at Suffolk University Law School since 1999, where he teaches courses in Professional Responsibility, Evidence and Trial Advocacy. He also teaches trial advocacy at the University of Massachusetts School of Law.

State judicial career

Boston Municipal Court service 
He was nominated by Governor Deval Patrick to the Boston Municipal Court in 2013. He presided over the Dorchester Drug Court from 2014 to 2018.

Massachusetts Supreme Judicial Court 
On November 17, 2020, Governor Charlie Baker nominated Georges to be an associate justice of the Supreme Judicial Court of Massachusetts to fill the vacancy left by Kimberly S. Budd who was elevated to be chief justice. On December 9, 2020, he was unanimously confirmed by the Massachusetts Governor's Council. He was sworn into office on December 16, 2020.

References

External links 

Year of birth missing (living people)
Place of birth missing (living people)
Living people
20th-century American lawyers
21st-century American judges
African-American judges
African-American lawyers
Boston College alumni
Justices of the Massachusetts Supreme Judicial Court
Massachusetts lawyers
Massachusetts state court judges
Suffolk University Law School alumni
Suffolk University Law School faculty
University of Massachusetts Dartmouth faculty
20th-century African-American people
21st-century African-American people